Gazi Shamsur Rahman ( – 12 August 1998) was a Bangladeshi lawyer, writer, translator, columnist and television personality. He was awarded Ekushey Padak in 1985 and Bangla Academy Literary Award in 1983 by the Government of Bangladesh. He wrote over 77 books on law and language in English and Bengali language.

Education and career
Rahman completed his MA and LLB from Aligarh Muslim University. He started his career as a district judge and retired as an additional secretary at the ministry of law of the Government of Bangladesh.

Rahman served as the chairperson of Bangladesh Press Institute and Bangla Academy for two terms during 1990–1992 and 1994–1996.

Marriage and family
Rahman was married to Zamal Ara Rahman (d. 2016), a graduate from Lady Brabourne College in Kolkata. Together they had three daughters and two sons, including Munjiba Shams, Professor at GonoSSVMedicalCollege and Ainun Nishat, a water resource specialist in Bangladesh.

References

1920s births
1998 deaths
20th-century Bangladeshi judges
Bangladeshi male writers
Bangladeshi translators
Aligarh Muslim University alumni
Recipients of the Ekushey Padak
Recipients of Bangla Academy Award
Date of birth missing
Place of death missing
20th-century translators